The 2021 San Diego Padres season was the 53rd season of the San Diego Padres franchise. The Padres played their home games at Petco Park as members of the Major League Baseball's National League West Division. The Padres entered the 2021 season expecting to contend for the World Series, having made several major acquisitions in the offseason, and held a playoff position in the Wild Card standings from April to late August. The Padres struggled down the stretch after reaching a season high 66-49 record, going 13-34 the rest of the way. The Padres were eliminated from playoff contention on September 25, and finished the 2021 season with an overall record of 79–83.

On April 9, 2021, newly acquired Joe Musgrove pitched a 3–0 no-hitter against the Texas Rangers, the first no-hitter in San Diego Padres history. The no-hitter also broke a streak of having gone 8,205 games without throwing one, a major league record.

Regular season

Season standings

National League West

National League Wild Card

Record vs. opponents

Game log 

|- style="background:#bfb;"
| 1 || April 1 || Diamondbacks || 8–7 || Pagán (1–0) || Young (0–1) || Melancon (1) || 10,350 || 1–0 || W1
|- style="background:#bfb;"
| 2 || April 2 || Diamondbacks || 4–2 || Pagán (2–0) || Kelly (0–1) || Melancon (2) || 10,350 || 2–0 || W2
|- style="background:#bfb;"
| 3 || April 3 || Diamondbacks || 7–0 || Musgrove (1–0) || Smith (0–1) || Weathers (1) || 10,350 || 3–0 || W3
|- style="background:#fbb;"
| 4 || April 4 || Diamondbacks || 1–3 || Widener (1–0) || Paddack (0–1) || Devenski (1) || 10,350 || 3–1 || L1
|- style="background:#fbb;"
| 5 || April 5 || Giants || 2–3 || Baragar (1–0) || Stammen (0–1) || McGee (2) || 10,350 || 3–2 || L2
|- style="background:#bfb;"
| 6 || April 6 || Giants || 4–1 || Kela (1–0) || Wisler (0–1) || Melancon (3) || 10,350 || 4–2 || W1
|- style="background:#fbb;"
| 7 || April 7 || Giants || 2–3  || Rogers (1–0) || Hill (0–1) || — || 10,350 || 4–3 || L1
|- style="background:#bfb;"
| 8 || April 9 || @ Rangers || 3–0 || Musgrove (2–0) || Arihara (0–1) || — || 27,575 || 5–3 || W1
|- style="background:#bfb;"
| 9 || April 10 || @ Rangers || 7–4 || Weathers (1–0) || Benjamin (0–1) || Melancon (4) || 35,856 || 6–3 || W2
|- style="background:#bfb;"
| 10 || April 11 || @ Rangers || 2–0 || Stammen (1–1) || Foltynewicz (0–2) || Melancon (5) || 26,723 || 7–3 || W3
|- style="background:#bfb;"
| 11 || April 12 || @ Pirates || 6–2 || Darvish (1–0) || Oviedo (0–1) || — || 4,068 || 8–3 || W4
|- style="background:#fbb;"
| 12 || April 13 || @ Pirates || 4–8 || Stratton (1–0) || Crismatt (0–1) || — || 4,814 || 8–4 || L1
|- style="background:#fbb;"
| 13 || April 14 || @ Pirates || 1–5 || Anderson (1–2) || Musgrove (2–1) || — || 5,228 || 8–5 || L2
|- style="background:#bfb;"
| 14 || April 15 || @ Pirates || 8–3 || Paddack (1–1) || Keller (1–2) || Stammen (1) || 4,023 || 9–5 || W1
|- style="background:#fbb;"
| 15 || April 16 || Dodgers || 6–11  || Price (1–0) || Hill (0–2) || — || 15,250 || 9–6 || L1
|- style="background:#fbb;"
| 16 || April 17 || Dodgers || 0–2 || Kershaw (3–1) || Darvish (1–1) || González (1) || 15,250 || 9–7 || L2
|- style="background:#bfb;"
| 17 || April 18 || Dodgers || 5–2 || Kela (2–0) || Alexander (0–1) || Melancon (6) || 15,250 || 10–7 || W1
|- style="background:#fbb;"
| 18 || April 19 || Brewers || 1–3 || Woodruff (1–0) || Musgrove (2–2) || Hader (2) || 15,250 || 10–8 || L1
|- style="background:#fbb;"
| 19 || April 20 || Brewers || 0–6 || Burnes (2–1) || Paddack (1–2) || — || 15,250 || 10–9 || L2
|- style="background:#fbb;"
| 20 || April 21 || Brewers || 2–4 || Suter (1–1) || Kela (2–1) || Hader (3) || 15,250 || 10–10 || L3
|- style="background:#bfb;"
| 21 || April 22 || @ Dodgers || 3–2 || Crismatt (1–1) || Treinen (1–1) || Melancon (7) || 15,167 || 11–10 || W1
|- style="background:#bfb;"
| 22 || April 23 || @ Dodgers || 6–1 || Darvish (2–1) || Kershaw (3–2) || — || 15,222 || 12–10 || W2
|- style="background:#fbb;"
| 23 || April 24 || @ Dodgers || 4–5 || Bauer (3–0) || Johnson (0–1) || Jansen (5) || 15,596 || 12–11 || L1
|- style="background:#bfb;"
| 24 || April 25 || @ Dodgers || 8–7  || Hill (1–2) || Cleavinger (0–1) || Melancon (8) || 15,316 || 13–11 || W1
|- style="background:#fbb;"
| 25 || April 27 || @ Diamondbacks || 1–5 || Kelly (2–2) || Paddack (1–3) || — || 10,486 || 13–12 || L1
|- style="background:#bfb;"
| 26 || April 28 || @ Diamondbacks || 12–3 || Northcraft (1–0) || Smith (1–1) || — || 9,495 || 14–12 || W1
|- style="background:#bfb;"
| 27 || April 30 || Giants || 3–2 || Darvish (3–1) || Webb (1–2) || Melancon (9) || 15,250 || 15–12 || W2
|-

|- style="background:#bfb;"
| 28 || May 1 || Giants || 6–2 || Snell (1–0) || DeSclafani (2–1) || — || 15,250 || 16–12 || W3
|- style="background:#fbb;"
| 29 || May 2 || Giants || 1–7 || Gausman (2–0) || Musgrove (2–3) || — || 15,250 || 16–13 || L1
|- style="background:#bfb;" 
| 30 || May 3 || Pirates || 2–0 || Hill (2–2) || Anderson (2–3) || Melancon (10) || 15,250 || 17–13 || W1
|- style="background:#fbb;"
| 31 || May 4 || Pirates || 1–2 || Keller (2–3) || Weathers (1–1) || Rodríguez (5) || 15,250 || 17–14 || L1
|- style="background:#bfb;" 
| 32 || May 5 || Pirates || 4–2 || Stammen (2–1) || Underwood Jr. (1–1) || Melancon (11) || 15,250 || 18–14 || W1
|- style="background:#fbb;"
| 33 || May 7 || @ Giants || 4–5 || Doval (1–1) || Kela (2–2) || McGee (8) || 9,219 || 18–15 || L1
|- style="background:#fbb;" 
| 34 || May 8 || @ Giants || 1–7 || Gausman (3–0) || Musgrove (2–4) || — || 9,764 || 18–16 || L2
|- style="background:#bfb;" 
| 35 || May 9 || @ Giants || 11–1 || Weathers (2–1) || Cueto (2–1) || — || 10,008 || 19–16 || W1
|- style="background:#bbb;" 
| — || May 10 || @ Rockies || colspan=7 | Postponed (rain, makeup May 12)
|- style="background:#bfb;"
| 36 || May 11 || @ Rockies || 8–1 || Díaz (1–0) || Senzatela (1–4) || — || 8,825 || 20–16 || W2
|- style="background:#bfb;"
| 37 || May 12  || @ Rockies || 5–3  || Pagán (3–0) || Gray (4–3) || Melancon (12) || N/A || 21–16 || W3
|- style="background:#fbb;" 
| 38 || May 12  || @ Rockies || 2–3  || Almonte (1–1) || Ramirez (0–1) || — || 11,968 || 21–17 || L1
|- style="background:#bfb;"
| 39 || May 14 || Cardinals || 5–4 || Musgrove (3–4) || Oviedo (0–2) || Melancon (13) || 15,250 || 22–17 || W1
|- style="background:#bfb;" 
| 40 || May 15 || Cardinals || 13–3 || Díaz (2–0) || Wainwright (2–4) || — || 15,250 || 23–17 || W2
|- style="background:#bfb;" 
| 41 || May 16 || Cardinals || 5–3 || Lamet (1–0) || Kim (1–1) || Melancon (14) || 15,250 || 24–17 || W3
|- style="background:#bfb;" 
| 42 || May 17 || Rockies || 7–0 || Darvish (4–1) || Gray (4–4) || — || 15,250 || 25–17 || W4
|- style="background:#bfb;"
| 43 || May 18 || Rockies || 2–1  || Johnson (1–1) || Bard (1–3) || — || 15,250 || 26–17 || W5
|- style="background:#bfb;" 
| 44 || May 19 || Rockies || 3–0 || Musgrove (4–4) || Gonzalez (2–2) || Melancon (15) || 15,250 || 27–17 || W6
|- style="background:#bfb;"
| 45 || May 21 || Mariners || 16–1 || Paddack (2–3) || Flexen (4–2) || — || 15,250 || 28–17 || W7
|- style="background:#bfb;" 
| 46 || May 22 || Mariners || 6–4 || Stammen (3–1) || Sheffield (3–4) || Melancon (16) || 15,250 || 29–17 || W8
|- style="background:#bfb;" 
| 47 || May 23 || Mariners || 9–2 || Darvish (5–1) || Misiewicz (2–3) || — || 15,250 || 30–17 || W9
|- style="background:#fbb;" 
| 48 || May 24 || @ Brewers || 3–5 || Woodruff (3–2) || Snell (1–1) || Hader (11) || 14,524 || 30–18 || L1
|- style="background:#bfb;" 
| 49 || May 25 || @ Brewers || 7–1 || Hill (3–2) || Burnes (2–4) || — || 13,566 || 31–18 || W1
|- style="background:#bfb;" 
| 50 || May 26 || @ Brewers || 2–1  || Adams (1–0) || Suter (3–3) || Melancon (17) || 13,478 || 32–18 || W2
|- style="background:#fbb;" 
| 51 || May 27 || @ Brewers || 5–6  || Suter (4–3) || Díaz (2–1) || — || 13,572 || 32–19 || L1
|- style="background:#bfb;" 
| 52 || May 28 || @ Astros || 10–3  || Melancon (1–0) || Raley (2–3) || — || 32,045 || 33–19 || W1
|- style="background:#bfb;"
| 53 || May 29 || @ Astros || 11–8  || Adams (2–0) || Garza (0–1) || Díaz (1) || 31,323 || 34–19 || W2
|- style="background:#fbb;" 
| 54 || May 30 || @ Astros || 4–7 || Greinke (5–2) || Snell (1–2) || — || 29,019 || 34–20 || L1
|- style="background:#fbb;" 
| 55 || May 31 || @ Cubs || 2–7 || Stewart (1–0) || Paddack (2–4) || — || 24,824 || 34–21 || L2
|-

|- style="background:#fbb;"
| 56 || June 1 || @ Cubs || 3–4 || Hendricks (6–4) || Weathers (2–2) || Kimbrel (13) || 24,824 || 34–22 || L2
|- style="background:#fbb;" 
| 57 || June 2 || @ Cubs || 1–6 || Alzolay (4–4) || Johnson (1–2) || — || 24,824 || 34–23 || L3
|- style="background:#bfb;"
| 58 || June 3 || Mets || 4–3 || Darvish (6–1) || Walker (4–2) || Melancon (18) || 15,250 || 35–23 || W1
|- style="background:#bfb;" 
| 59 || June 4 || Mets || 2–0 || Snell (2–2) || Lucchesi (1–4) || Melancon (19) || 15,250 || 36–23 || W2
|- style="background:#fbb;" 
| 60 || June 5 || Mets || 0–4 || deGrom (5–2) || Musgrove (4–5) || — || 15,250 || 36–24 || L1
|- style="background:#fbb;" 
| 61 || June 6 || Mets || 2–6 || Stroman (5–4) || Paddack (2–5) || — || 15,250 || 36–25 || L2
|- style="background:#bfb;" 
| 62 || June 7 || Cubs || 9–4 || Weathers (3–2) || Alzolay (4–5) || — || 15,250 || 37–25 || W1
|- style="background:#fbb;" 
| 63 || June 8 || Cubs || 1–7 || Davies (3–3) || Lamet (1–1) || — || 16,207 || 37–26 || L1
|- style="background:#fbb;" 
| 64 || June 9 || Cubs || 1–3 || Brothers (2–0) || Darvish (6–2) || Kimbrel (15) || 15,250 || 37–27 || L2
|- style="background:#fbb;" 
| 65 || June 11 || @ Mets || 2–3 || deGrom (6–2) || Snell (2–3) || Díaz (11) || 26,637 || 37–28 || L3
|- style="background:#fbb;" 
| 66 || June 12 || @ Mets || 1–4 || Stroman (6–4) || Musgrove (4–6) || Díaz (12) || 25,463 || 37–29 || L4
|- style="background:#bfb;" 
| 67 || June 13 || @ Mets || 7–3 || Paddack (3–5) || Familia (2–1) || — || 19,581 || 38–29 || W1
|- style="background:#fbb;" 
| 68 || June 14 || @ Rockies || 2–3 || Gomber (6–5) || Lamet (1–2) || Bard (9) || 23,027 || 38–30 || L1
|- style="background:#fbb;" 
| 69 || June 15 || @ Rockies || 4–8 || Estévez (1–0) || Hill (3–3) || — || 22,871 || 38–31 || L2
|- style="background:#fbb;" 
| 70 || June 16 || @ Rockies || 7–8 || Estévez (2–0) || Adams (2–1) || — || 18,798 || 38–32 || L3
|- style="background:#bfb;" 
| 71 || June 17 || Reds || 6–4 || Johnson (2–2) || Garrett (0–2) || — || 40,362 || 39–32 || W1
|- style="background:#bfb;" 
| 72 || June 18 || Reds || 8–2 || Paddack (4–5) || Santillan (0–1) || — || 33,456 || 40–32 || W2
|- style="background:#bfb;"
| 73 || June 19 || Reds || 7–5 || Crismatt (2–1) || Hembree (1–2) || Melancon (20) || 38,765 || 41–32 || W3
|- style="background:#bfb;" 
| 74 || June 20 || Reds || 3–2 || Lamet (2–2) || Castillo (2–10) || Melancon (21) || 38,004 || 42–32 || W4
|- style="background:#bfb;" 
| 75 || June 21 || Dodgers || 6–2 || Darvish (7–2) || Urías (9–3) || — || 42,220 || 43–32 || W5
|- style="background:#bfb;" 
| 76 || June 22 || Dodgers || 3–2 || Snell (3–3) || Kershaw (8–7) || Melancon (22) || 42,667 || 44–32 || W6
|- style="background:#bfb;" 
| 77 || June 23 || Dodgers || 5–3 || Hill (4–3) || Treinen (1–3) || Melancon (23) || 43,691 || 45–32 || W7
|- style="background:#bfb;" 
| 78 || June 25 || Diamondbacks || 11–5 || Ramirez (1–1) || Martin (0–3) || — || 32,583 || 46–32 || W8
|- style="background:#fbb;"
| 79 || June 26 || Diamondbacks || 1–10 || Kelly (4–7) || Lamet (2–3) || — || 40,557 || 46–33 || L1
|- style="background:#bfb;" 
| 80 || June 27 || Diamondbacks || 5–4 || Hill (5–3) || Peacock (2–6) || Melancon (24) || 34,905 || 47–33 || W1
|- style="background:#bfb;" 
| 81 || June 29 || @ Reds || 5–4 || Pagán (4–0) || Santillan (1–2) || Melancon (25) || 16,332 || 48–33 || W2
|- style="background:#bfb;" 
| 82 || June 30 || @ Reds || 7–5  || Musgrove (5–6) || Gutiérrez (3–3) || Hill (1) || 12,084 || 49–33 || W3
|-

|- style="background:#fbb;" 
| 83 || July 1 || @ Reds || 4–5 || Warren (1–0) || Melancon (1–1) || — || 16,620 || 49–34 || L1
|- style="background:#fbb;" 
| 84 || July 2 || @ Phillies || 3–4  || Suárez (4–2) || Adams (2–2) || — || 22,653 || 49–35 || L2
|- style="background:#fbb;"
| 85 || July 3 || @ Phillies || 2–4 || Eflin (3–6) || Darvish (7–3) || Suárez (1) || 25,053 || 49–36 || L3
|- style="background:#bfb;" 
| 86 || July 4 || @ Phillies || 11–1 || Adams (3–2) || Velasquez (3–3) || — || 25,592 || 50–36 || W1
|- style="background:#fbb;" 
| 87 || July 5 || Nationals || 5–7 || Suero (1–2) || Hill (5–4) || Hand (19) || 33,168 || 50–37 || L1
|- style="background:#bfb;" 
| 88 || July 6 || Nationals || 7–4 || Weathers (4–2) || Fedde (4–5) || Melancon (26) || 29,977 || 51–37 || W1
|- style="background:#fbb;" 
| 89 || July 7 || Nationals || 5–15 || Corbin (6–7) || Paddack (4–6) || — || 26,353 || 51–38 || L1
|- style="background:#bfb;" 
| 90 || July 8 || Nationals || 9–8 || Melancon (2–1) || Clay (0–2) || — || 29,434 || 52–38 || W1
|- style="background:#bfb;" 
| 91 || July 9 || Rockies || 4–2 || Díaz (3–1) || Freeland (1–3) || Melancon (27) || 34,953 || 53–38 || W2
|- style="background:#fbb;" 
| 92 || July 10 || Rockies || 0–3 || Márquez (8–6) || Musgrove (5–7) || Bard (13) || 42,351 || 53–39 || L1
|- style="background:#fbb;" 
| 93 || July 11 || Rockies || 1–3 || Gray (6–6) || Stammen (3–2) || Bard (14) || 38,235 || 53–40 || L2
|-style="text-align:center; background:#bbcaff;"
| colspan="10"|91st All-Star Game in Denver, CO
|-style="text-align:center; background:#bbcaff;"
| colspan=10 |Representing the Padres: Fernando Tatís Jr., Jake Cronenworth, Manny Machado, Yu Darvish, & Mark Melancon 
|- style="background:#bfb;" 
| 94 || July 16 || @ Nationals || 24–8 || Paddack (5–6) || Fedde (4–7) || — || 29,203 || 54–40 || W1
|- style="background:#bfb;" 
| 95 || July 17/18 || @ Nationals || 10–4 || Stammen (4–2) || Corbin (6–8) || — || 33,232 || 55–40 || W2
|- style="background:#fbb;" 
| 96 || July 18 || @ Nationals || 7–8 || Hand (5–2) || Melancon (2–2) || — || 27,221 || 55–41 || L1
|- style="background:#bbb;" 
| — || July 19 || @ Braves || colspan=7| Postponed (Rain, makeup July 21)
|- style="background:#fbb;" 
| 97 || July 20 || @ Braves || 1–2 || Toussaint (1–0) || Darvish (7–4) || Smith (19) || 36,621 || 55–42 || L2
|- style="background:#bfb;"
| 98 || July 21  || @ Braves || 3–2  || Paddack (6–6) || Muller (1–3) || Melancon (28) || 28,621 || 56–42 || W1
|- style="background:#bbb;" 
| — || July 21  || @ Braves || colspan=8| Suspended (Rain, Makeup: September 24)
|- style="background:#bfb;" 
| 99 || July 22 || @ Marlins || 3–2 || Snell (4–3) || Holloway (2–3) || Melancon (29) || 10,977 || 57–42 || W2
|- style="background:#bfb;" 
| 100 || July 23 || @ Marlins || 5–2 || Musgrove (6–7) || Thompson (2–3) || Melancon (30) || 9,264 || 58–42 || W3
|- style="background:#fbb;" 
| 101 || July 24 || @ Marlins || 2–3 || Garrett (1–1) || Hill (5–5) || García (15) || 13,207 || 58–43 || L1
|- style="background:#fbb;" 
| 102 || July 25 || @ Marlins || 3–9 || Bender (2–1) || Darvish (7–5) || — || 12,765 || 58–44 || L2
|- style="background:#bfb;" 
| 103 || July 27 || Athletics || 7–4 || Paddack (7–6) || Kaprielian (5–4) || Melancon (31) || 40,162 || 59–44 || W1
|- style="background:#fbb;"
| 104 || July 28 || Athletics || 4–10 || Manaea (8–6) || Snell (4–4) || — || 35,351 || 59–45 || L1
|- style="background:#bfb;"  
| 105 || July 29 || Rockies || 3–0 || Musgrove (7–7) || Freeland (1–6) || Melancon (32) || 31,884 || 60–45 || W1
|- style="background:#fbb;" 
| 106 || July 30 || Rockies || 4–9 || Gray (7–6) || Weathers (4–3) || — || 38,686 || 60–46 || L1
|- style="background:#fbb;" 
| 107 || July 31 || Rockies || 3–5 || Márquez (9–8) || Darvish (7–6) || Bard (16) || 44,144 || 60–47 || L2
|-

|- style="background:#bfb;" 
| 108 || August 1 || Rockies || 8–1 || Stammen (5–2) || Gomber (8–6) || — || 36,247 || 61–47 || W1
|- style="background:#bfb;"
| 109 || August 3 || @ Athletics || 8–1 || Snell (5–4) || Manaea (8–7) || — || 11,985 || 62–47 || W2
|- style="background:#fbb;" 
| 110 || August 4 || @ Athletics || 4–5  || Trivino (4–4) || Hill (5–6) || — || 10,648 || 62–48 || L1
|- style="background:#fbb;" 
| 111 || August 6 || Diamondbacks || 5–8 || Peacock (5–6) || Weathers (4–4) || Poppen (1) || 34,038 || 62–49 || L2
|- style="background:#bfb;" 
| 112 || August 7 || Diamondbacks || 6–2 || Pomeranz (1–0) || de Geus (2–1) || — || 39,134 || 63–49 || W1
|- style="background:#bfb;" 
| 113 || August 8 || Diamondbacks || 2–0 || Snell (6–4) || Bumgarner (6–7) || Melancon (33) || 30,989 || 64–49 || W2
|- style="background:#bfb;"  
| 114 || August 9 || Marlins || 8–3 || Musgrove (8–7) || Thompson (2–5) || — || 26,841 || 65–49 || W3
|- style="background:#bfb;"  
| 115 || August 10 || Marlins || 6–5 || Johnson (3–2) || Bleier (2-2) || Melancon (34) || 32,060 || 66–49 || W4
|- style="background:#fbb;"
| 116 || August 11 || Marlins || 0–7 || Alcántara (7–10) || Weathers (4–5) || — || 29,753 || 66–50 || L1
|- style="background:#fbb;"
| 117 || August 12 || @ Diamondbacks || 3–12 || Smith (4–8) || Darvish (7–7) || — || 9,086 || 66–51 || L2
|- style="background:#fbb;"
| 118 || August 13 || @ Diamondbacks || 2–3 || Clippard (1–0) || Stammen (5–3) || — || 12,866 || 66–52 || L3
|- style="background:#fbb;" 
| 119 || August 14 || @ Diamondbacks || 0–7 || Gilbert (1–1) || Musgrove (8–8) || — || 16,716 || 66–53 || L4
|- style="background:#bfb;" 
| 120 || August 15 || @ Diamondbacks || 8–2 || Knehr (1–0) || Gallen (1–7) || — || 17,722 || 67–53 || W1
|- style="background:#fbb;" 
| 121 || August 16 || @ Rockies || 5–6 || Bard (6–5) || Hudson (4–2) || — || 24,565 || 67–54 || L1
|- style="background:#fbb;" 
| 122 || August 17 || @ Rockies || 3–7 || Márquez (11–9) || Strahm (0–1) || — || 28,139 || 67–55 || L2
|- style="background:#fbb;"
| 123 || August 18 || @ Rockies || 5–7 || Bowden (2–2) || Arrieta (5–12) || Bard (20) || 20,692 || 67–56 || L3
|- style="background:#fbb;" 
| 124 || August 20 || Phillies || 3–4 || Neris (2–5) || Snell (6–5) || Kennedy (20) || 40,927 || 67–57 || L4
|- style="background:#bfb;"
| 125 || August 21 || Phillies || 4–3  || Melancon (3–2) || Brogdon (5–3) || — || 43,383 || 68–57 || W1
|- style="background:#fbb;" 
| 126 || August 22 || Phillies || 4–7 || Gibson (9–5) || Weathers (4–6) || — || 38,548 || 68–58 || L1
|- style="background:#fbb;"
| 127 || August 24 || Dodgers || 2–5 || Urías (14–3) || Johnson (3–3) || Jansen (28) || 41,676 || 68–59 || L2
|- style="background:#fbb;"
| 128 || August 25 || Dodgers || 3–5  || Knebel (3–0) || Camarena (0–1) || Greene (1) || 41,765 || 68–60 || L3
|- style="background:#fbb;"
| 129 || August 26 || Dodgers || 0–4 || Scherzer (12–4) || Darvish (7–8) || — || 43,383 || 68–61 || L4
|- style="background:#bfb;"
| 130 || August 27 || @ Angels || 5–0 || Musgrove (9–8) || Criswell (0–1) || — || 25,376 || 69–61 || W1
|- style="background:#fbb;"
| 131 || August 28 || @ Angels || 2–10 || Wantz (1–0) || Weathers (4–7) || — || 36,176 || 69–62 || L1
|- style="background:#bfb;" 
| 132 || August 30 || @ Diamondbacks || 7–5 || Stammen (6–3) || Gilbert (1–2) || Melancon (35) || 8,482 || 70–62 || W1
|- style="background:#bfb;" 
| 133 || August 31 || @ Diamondbacks || 3–0 || Snell (7–5) || Gallen (2–8) || Melancon (36) || 10,818 || 71–62 || W2
|-

|- style="background:#fbb;" 
| 134 || September 1 || @ Diamondbacks || 3–8 || Weaver (3–3) || Darvish (7–9) || — || 5,945 || 71–63 || L1
|- style="background:#fbb;" 
| 135 || September 3 || Astros || 3–6 || Taylor (3–4) || Pagán (4–1) || Pressly (23) || 37,033 || 71–64 || L2
|- style="background:#bfb;" 
| 136 || September 4 || Astros || 10–2 || Musgrove (10–8) || Valdez (9–5) || — || 35,338 || 72–64 || W1
|- style="background:#bfb;" 
| 137 || September 5 || Astros || 4–3 || Melancon (4–2) || Stanek (1–4) || — || 35,007 || 73–64 || W2
|- style="background:#fbb;" 
| 138 || September 7 || Angels || 0–4 || Herget (2–1) || Snell (7–6) || — || 34,405 || 73–65 || L1
|- style="background:#bfb;" 
| 139 || September 8 || Angels || 8–5 || Darvish (8–9) || Mayers (3–4) || Melancon (37) || 34,537 || 74–65 || W1
|- style="background:#fbb;"
| 140 || September 10 || @ Dodgers || 0–3 || Urías (17–3) || Musgrove (10–9) || Jansen (31) || 48,403 || 74–66 || L1
|- style="background:#fbb;" 
| 141 || September 11 || @ Dodgers || 4–5 || Buehler (14–3) || Paddack (7–7) || Jansen (32) || 46,969 || 74–67 || L2
|- style="background:#fbb;" 
| 142 || September 12 || @ Dodgers || 0–8 || Scherzer (14–4) || Lamet (2–4) || — || 42,637 || 74–68 || L3
|- style="background:#fbb;"
| 143 || September 13 || @ Giants || 1–9 || Littell (3–0) || Darvish (8–10) || — || 21,078 || 74–69 || L4
|- style="background:#fbb;" 
| 144 || September 14 || @ Giants || 1–6 || DeSclafani (12–6) || Arrieta (5–13) || — || 23,192 || 74–70 || L5
|- style="background:#bfb;"
| 145 || September 15 || @ Giants || 9–6 || Musgrove (11–9) || Leone (3–4) || — || 21,212 || 75–70 || W1
|- style="background:#bfb;" 
| 146 || September 16 || @ Giants || 7–4 || Crismatt (3–1) || Gausman (14–6) || — || 23,379 || 76–70 || W2
|- style="background:#fbb;" 
| 147 || September 17 || @ Cardinals || 2–8 || Mikolas (1–2) || Velasquez (3–7) || — || 30,937 || 76–71 || L1
|- style="background:#fbb;" 
| 148 || September 18 || @ Cardinals || 2–3 || Miller (1–0) || Pagán (4–2) || Gallegos (9) || 40,626 || 76–72 || L2
|- style="background:#fbb;" 
| 149 || September 19 || @ Cardinals || 7–8 || Reyes (9–8) || Arrieta (5–14) || Gallegos (10) || 35,326 || 76–73 || L3
|- style="background:#fbb;" 
| 150 || September 21 || Giants || 5–6 || Watson (6–4) || Melancon (4–3) || Rogers (13) || 36,439 || 76–74 || L4
|- style="background:#fbb;" 
| 151 || September 22 || Giants || 6–8 || Doval (4–1) || Velasquez (3–8) || — || 38,189 || 76–75 || L5
|- style="background:#bfb;" 
| 152 || September 23 || Giants || 7–6  || Detwiler (3–1) || Leone (3–5) || — || 31,049 || 77–75 || W1
|- style="background:#bfb;" 
| 153 || September 24  || @ Braves || 6–5  || Hudson (5–1) || Smith (3–6) || Melancon (29) || N/A || 78–75 || W2
|- style="background:#fbb;" 
| 154 || September 24  || Braves || 0–4 || Fried (13–7) || Knehr (1–1) || — || 33,265 || 78–76 || L1
|- style="background:#fbb;" 
| 155 || September 25 || Braves || 8–10  || Rodríguez (5–4) || Hudson (5–3) || Smith (34) || 39,026 || 78–77 || L2
|- style="background:#fbb;"
| 156 || September 26 || Braves || 3–4 || Minter (3–6) || Johnson (3–4) || Smith (35) || 41,294 || 78–78 || L3
|- style="background:#fbb;" 
| 157 || September 28 || @ Dodgers || 1–2 || Buehler (15–4) || Darvish (8–11) || Treinen (7) || 52,128 || 78–79 || L4
|- style="background:#fbb;" 
| 158 || September 29 || @ Dodgers || 9–11 || Price (5–2) || Pagán (4–3) || Jansen (37) || 45,366 || 78–80 || L5
|- style="background:#fbb;"
| 159 || September 30 || @ Dodgers || 3–8 || Knebel (4–0) || Velasquez (3–9) || — || 52,550 || 78–81 || L6
|-

|- style="background:#fbb;" 
| 160 || October 1 || @ Giants || 0–3 || DeSclafani (13–7) || Ávila (0–1) || Doval (3) || 33,975 || 78–82 || L7
|- style="background:#bfb;" 
| 161 || October 2 || @ Giants || 3–2  || Hill (6–6) || Castro (1–1) || Melancon (39) || 40,760 || 79–82 || W1
|- style="background:#fbb;" 
| 162 || October 3 || @ Giants || 4–11 || Webb (11–3) || Knehr (1–2) || — || 36,901 || 79–83 || L1
|-

|- style="text-align:center;"
| Legend:       = Win       = Loss       = PostponementBold = Padres team member

Roster

Farm system

Notes

References

External links 
 San Diego Padres official site
 2021 San Diego Padres at Baseball-Reference.com

San Diego Padres seasons
San Diego Padres
San Diego Padres